William Lorenz "Larry" Kopf  (November 3, 1890 – October 15, 1986) was a professional baseball player who played infielder in the Major Leagues from  to . He would play for the Cleveland Indians, Philadelphia Athletics, Boston Braves and Cincinnati Reds.  Best known for his part in the only double no hitter in major league history. Kopf led off the tenth inning with a line drive single, breaking up a full nine innings without a hit for either team. He later scored on a single by Jim Thorpe.

He was the brother of football coach Herb Kopf.

References

External links

 Interview with Larry Kopf conducted by Eugene Murdock, March 13, 1974, in Cincinnati, Ohio (1 hour 30 minutes)
 

1890 births
1986 deaths
Major League Baseball infielders
Boston Braves players
Cincinnati Reds players
Cleveland Naps players
Philadelphia Athletics players
Fordham Rams baseball players
Georgetown Hoyas baseball coaches
Akron Champs players
Baltimore Orioles (IL) players
Fall River Brienies players
New Haven Murlins players
People from Bristol, Connecticut
Baseball players from Connecticut